This is a list of mayors of Arbon, Thurgau, Switzerland. The mayor of Arbon (Stadtammann von Arbon) chairs the city council (Stadtrat).

References

Arbon
 
Arbon